Pedro Costa (born 1958) is Portuguese film director.

Pedro Costa may also refer to:
Pedro Costa (footballer, born 1981), Portuguese footballer
Pedro Costa (musician), Canadian composer
Pedro Costa (futsal player) (born 1978), Portuguese futsal player
Pedro Costa (footballer, born 1991), Portuguese footballer
Pedro Moura Costa (born 1963), Brazilian businessman
Pedro Costa (sailor), Portuguese sailor